is a manga series written and illustrated by Shu Katayama. It was serialized in the Shinshokan magazine Wings from 1988 to 2005.

A one-shot original video animation (OVA) anime based on the manga was released on March 20, 1991.

Plot 
The series follows Ling Fei-long, a Chinese transfer student living in Japan. Ling is the son of the leader of the White Dragon clan, one of four clans who live in the mountains of China and are descended from mythical beasts. After killing an ordinary human, Ling is banished to Japan so that he might learn about humanity and how to control his powers around them.

Volumes 
Dragon Fist has been released in tankōbon and bunkobon form.

Tankōbon 
 . Released in June 1988.
 . Released in June 1989.
 . Released in November 1991.
 . Released in January 1993.
 . Released in October 1993.
 . Released in October 1994.
 . Released in July 1995.
 . Released in March 1996.
 . Released in June 1997.
 . Released in May 1998.
 . Released in February 1999.
 . Released in October 2000.
 . Released in November 2004.
 . Released in May 2005.

Bunkobon 
 . Released in April 2007.
 . Released in April 2007.
 . Released in May 2007.
 . Released in May 2007.
 . Released in June 2007.
 . Released in June 2007.
 . Released in July 2007.
 . Released in July 2007.

External links 

1988 manga
1991 anime OVAs
Fantasy anime and manga
Martial arts anime and manga
Shinshokan manga
Shōjo manga